An All-American team is an honorary sports team composed of the best amateur players of a specific season for each team position—who in turn are given the honorific "All-America" and typically referred to as "All-American athletes", or simply "All-Americans".  Although the honorees generally do not compete together as a unit, the term is used in U.S. team sports to refer to players who are selected by members of the national media.  
From 1947 to 1980, the American Baseball Coaches Association was the only All-American selector recognized by the NCAA.

Key

All-Americans

See also
Baseball awards #U.S. college baseball

References

College Baseball All-America Teams
All-America